The Coleman–Scott House is a Colonial Revival house in Northeast Portland, Oregon.  It was listed on the National Register of Historic Places in 1985. It was built in 1916 and designed by John V. Bennes.

References

1916 establishments in Oregon
Colonial Revival architecture in Oregon
Houses completed in 1916
Houses on the National Register of Historic Places in Portland, Oregon
Irvington, Portland, Oregon
Portland Historic Landmarks